Angolhitheemu (Dhivehi: އަނގޮޅިތީމު) is one of the islands in Raa Atoll with population of 500 people.

History
Angolhitheem is conceded as on one of the islands in which the early settlers of Maldives lived.

Geography

Demography

The total population of An'golhitheem is around 500 people including men, women and children and almost 200 people are living on the island. Rest of people living in capital city Malé, other few islands and commercial island including resorts.

Economy
The people of An'golhitheem work at either resort jobs or government jobs, while most of the women work locally for their income.

References

Islands of the Maldives